Paprotki may refer to the following places in Poland:
Paprotki, Lower Silesian Voivodeship (south-west Poland)
Paprotki, Warmian-Masurian Voivodeship (north Poland)
Paprotki, West Pomeranian Voivodeship (north-west Poland)